The 2023 Pacific hurricane season is an upcoming event in the annual tropical cyclone season in the northern hemisphere. The season will officially begin on May 15 in the Eastern Pacific Ocean, and on June 1 in the Central Pacific; both will end on November 30. These dates historically describe the period each year when most tropical cyclones form in the Pacific Ocean basin and are adopted by convention. However, the formation of tropical cyclones is possible at any time of the year.

Storm names

The following names will be used for named storms that form in the northeastern Pacific Ocean during 2023. Retired names, if any, will be announced by the World Meteorological Organization during the joint 46th Sessions of the RA IV Hurricane Committee in the spring of 2024. The names not retired from this list will be used again in the 2029 season. This is the same list used in the 2017 season.

For storms that form in the Central Pacific Hurricane Center's area of responsibility, encompassing the area between 140 degrees west and the International Date Line, all names are used in a series of four rotating lists. The next four names that will be slated for use in 2023 are shown below.

Season effects
This is a table of all the storms and that have formed in the 2023 Pacific hurricane season. It includes their duration, names, landfall(s), denoted in parentheses, damages, and death totals. Deaths in parentheses are additional and indirect (an example of an indirect death would be a traffic accident), but were still related to that storm. Damage and deaths include totals while the storm was extratropical, a tropical wave, or a low, and all the damage figures are in 2023 USD.

See also

 Weather of 2023
 Tropical cyclones in 2023
 Pacific hurricane
 List of Pacific hurricane records
 2023 Atlantic hurricane season
 2023 Pacific typhoon season
 2023 North Indian Ocean cyclone season
 South-West Indian Ocean cyclone seasons: 2022–23, 2023–24
 Australian region cyclone seasons: 2022–23, 2023–24
 South Pacific cyclone seasons: 2022–23, 2023–24

Notes

References

External links 

National Hurricane Center and Central Pacific Hurricane Center (website)
Servicio Meteorológico Nacional (website, in Spanish)
Joint Typhoon Warning Center (website)

2023
2023 Epac